USS Clarke County (LST-601), originally USS LST-601, was a United States Navy  built during World War II and in commission from 1944 to 1955 and again in the late 1960s. Named after Clarke County, Alabama; Clarke County, Georgia; Clarke County, Iowa; Clarke County, Mississippi; and Clarke County, Virginia, she was the only U.S. Navy vessel to bear the name.

Construction and commissioning
USS LST-601 was laid down on 21 October 1943 at Seneca, Illinois, by the Chicago Bridge and Iron Company. She was launched on 4 March 1944, sponsored by Mrs. Celia Counter Finch, and commissioned on 25 March 1944.

First period in commission, 1944–1955
During World War II, LST-601 was assigned to the European Theater of Operations and participated in Operation Dragoon, the invasion of southern France in August and September 1944. At the close of World War II, LST-601 remained in active service in Amphibious Force, United States Atlantic Fleet.

LST-601 was renamed USS Clarke County (LST-601) on 1 July 1955. She was decommissioned on 23 November 1955.

Second period in commissiong, late 1960s
Clarke County was recommissioned on 28 July 1966 and performed service in the Vietnam War from 1967 to 1970. 21 November 1967 she struck a sunken landing craft while attempting to beach at Doc Pho, South Vietnam. Clarke County was refloated on 1 December 1967.

Awards and honors
LST-601 received one battle star for World War II service. Clarke County received six campaign stars plus two awards of the Meritorious Unit Commendation for Vietnam War service.

Transfer to Indonesia
Clarke County was decommissioned and stricken from the Navy Directory after her Vietnam War service had ended.

References

Sources
 
 

 

LST-542-class tank landing ships
Ships built in Seneca, Illinois
1944 ships
World War II amphibious warfare vessels of the United States
Cold War amphibious warfare vessels of the United States
Vietnam War amphibious warfare vessels of the United States
Clarke County, Alabama
Clarke County, Georgia
Clarke County, Iowa
Clarke County, Mississippi
Clarke County, Virginia
LST-542-class tank landing ships of the Indonesian Navy